Apalachee Bay is a bay in the northeastern Gulf of Mexico occupying an indentation of the Florida coast to the west of where the Florida peninsula joins the United States mainland.  It is bordered by Taylor, Jefferson, Wakulla, and Franklin counties.

The Aucilla, Econfina, St. Marks, and Ochlockonee rivers drain into the bay. In 1528 five boats were constructed by Pánfilo de Narváez in the bay. It is named for the Apalachee tribe which lived between the Aucilla and Ochlockonee rivers until the 18th century. Most of the bay's coast is the St. Marks National Wildlife Refuge.

Underwater archaeological sites
Beginning in the 1980s submerged archaeological sites have been identified and examined on the seabed of Apalachee Bay. During the height of the last glacial period, global sea levels were at least  lower than in the 20th Century. Sea levels were rising when the first people reached Florida late in the Pleistocene epoch. Sea level at the end of the Pleistocene epoch was about  lower than at present. By about 8,000 years BP sea level had risen to about  lower than at present. Because of the very gentle slope of the Florida platform, the ancient coastline was far to the west of the 20th Century coastline.

The lower sea levels of the late Pleistocene and early Holocene epochs resulted in a drier climate, a lower water table, and little surface water in Florida. Often in landscapes dominated by karst systems, such as the land adjacent to Apalachee Bay, including the formerly dry land currently submerged under the bay, the only available fresh water was in sinkholes along dried-up riverbeds.

Many sites where people were present in the late Pleistocene and early Holocene epochs have been found in the Big Bend region adjacent to Apalachee Bay, and particularly in sinkholes in the bed of the Aucilla River. Some of these sites show evidence of the presence of people in the late Pleistocene, even before the appearance of the Clovis culture (see Page-Ladson). The broad, shallow continental shelf under Apalachee Bay adjacent to a region with abundant archaeological sites led to the prediction that archaeological sites could be found on the formerly dry land that has since been submerged beneath the bay.

The sea floor under Apalachee Bay was surveyed to identify now submerged river courses. Parts of the course of the Paleoaucilla, as well as fragments of possible ancient courses of other rivers were found, and sites with evidence of human activity have been found along them. Sites identified along the Paleoaucilla in the J&J Hunt Submerged Archaeological Site (8JE740), the Ontolo site (8JE1577) and Area 91-B (8JE781). Based on tools found and Radiocarbon dating, the J&J Hunt, Ontolo and Area 91-B sites were occupied from late in the Paleoindian period until the middle of the Archaic period.

To the east of the Paleoaucilla, an archaeological site has been found in what may be the ancient channel of the Econfina River. The site includes an area where stone tools were found and a shell midden, with a spring nearby. Radiocarbon dating of shells from the midden yielded dates of 4510 years BP +/- 461 years, and 2621 years BP +/- 423 years.

West of the sites along the Paleoaucilla is the Fitch site (8JE739), on a channel that may be the Paleopinhook. (The Pinhook River is a short stream just to the west of the mouth of the Aucilla River.) The Fitch site may have been used as a chert quarry early in the Archaic period, before 7500 years BP.

The site was described as a sinkhole with a flowing spring in 1976. The hole appears to have been partially filled with debris since then, possibly as a result of turbulence from hurricanes that passed over Apalachee Bay. The site is associated with the “Ray Hole Trough”, part of the Paleoaucilla channel. Radiocarbon dates indicate Ray Hole was inundated between 8220 and 7390 years BP.

Notes

References

Bays of Florida on the Gulf of Mexico
Bodies of water of Taylor County, Florida
Bodies of water of Jefferson County, Florida
Bodies of water of Wakulla County, Florida
Bodies of water of Franklin County, Florida